Roza Lailatul Fitria better known as Oza Kioza  is an Indonesian singer-songwriter. She is a member of the Indonesian girl group Duo Serigala since the group announced their new members in May 2017. Oza Kioza began her musical career in 2007, featuring on Indosiar's StarDut. In 2015, she made her debut single, Aki-Aki Gila.

Personal Journey 
Oza was born in Tulungagung regency, then moved to Nongkojajar, Tutur, Pasuruan when the age of 3 years after Oza's parent got divorced. Oza then moved to Purwodadi, Blimbing, Malang when entering elementary school age. In Malang, Oza undergoes formal education from elementary to intermediate level, successively at SDN 1 Purwodadi, SMPN 6 Malang, and SMA 9 Malang. Oza did not complete his formal education at high school level, because when he was in high school he was admitted to INTI College Indonesia majoring in business. However, the lecture was not completed.

Oza Kioza became a singer after following the direction of his mother, Nurhayati, who is a jazz and dangdut singer. While Oza's father is also not far from vocal affairs for being qori. On 2 November 2007 Oza Kioza attended the StarDut event at Indosiar. Despite failing to become champion, StarDut managed to open the gates of Oza to shake from stage to stage.

Discography

Album

as the main vocalist 
 House DJ 4G Horegg (28 April 2017)

Single

as the main vocalist 
 Aki Aki Gila (24 Juni 2015)
 10 11 (18 November 2016)
 Lungset (28 April 2017)
 Ojo Nguber Welase (28 April 2017)
 Masihkah Ada (28 April 2017)
I'm Sorry I Love You (16 Juni 2017)

As the lead vocalist Duo Serigala 
 Kost Kostan (23 May 2017)
 Sayang (16 November 2017)

References

External links 
 Oza Kioza on YouTube

1994 births
Living people
Indonesian pop singers
Indonesian songwriters
Indonesian female models
People from Tulungagung Regency